Edris Saint-Amand (born 26 March 1918; died 9 february 2004) was a Haitian novelist. Born in Gonaïves, one of Saint-Amand's most notable novels is Bon Dieu Rit (1952).

References

 

1918 births
2004 deaths
20th-century Haitian novelists
Haitian male novelists
People from Gonaïves
20th-century male writers